The Pentax Q-S1 is a compact digital mirrorless interchangeable lens camera announced by Ricoh under the Pentax brand on August 4, 2014. It replaces the Pentax Q7, and is part of Pentax' Q system, the most compact digital interchangeable lens camera system as of September 2014, with crop factors ranging from 4.6 (Q7, Q-S1) to 5.6 (Q, Q10).

The Q-S1 has in-body image stabilization as well as a built in flash. It is available in a variety of color combinations. In video mode it can auto focus while shooting with the 01, 02 and 08 lenses.

Discontinued as of January, 2020.

References
http://www.dpreview.com/products/pentax/slrs/pentax_qs1/specifications

Q-S1
Cameras introduced in 2014